Drew Dennis Dix (born December 14, 1944) is a decorated United States military veteran and retired major in the United States Army. He received the Medal of Honor for his actions in the Vietnam War; he was the first enlisted Special Forces soldier to receive the medal.

Early life
Dix was born in West Point, New York, and raised in Pueblo, Colorado.

Military career
Dix enlisted in the United States Army at age 18 in 1962, hoping to join the Special Forces. Initially turned down because of his young age, he spent three years serving with the 82nd Airborne Division before being accepted into the Special Forces at the age of 21. During this time, he served in Operation Power Pack, the United States military intervention in the Dominican Republic.

By 1968, Dix had reached the rank of staff sergeant, and was assigned as a military adviser to the Army of the Republic of Vietnam (ARVN) in Chau Phu, South Vietnam, near the Cambodian border. On January 31, 1968, Viet Cong forces attacked Chau Phu in the first days of the Tet Offensive. Throughout that day and the next, Dix led groups of local fighters in rescuing endangered civilians and driving Viet Cong forces out of buildings in the city.

For these actions, Dix was awarded the Medal of Honor by President Lyndon B. Johnson during a ceremony at the White House on January 19, 1969. He is one of four Medal of Honor recipients from Pueblo, Colorado. In 1993, the Pueblo City Council adopted the tagline "Home of Heroes" for the city due to the fact that Pueblo can claim more recipients of the Medal per capita than any other city in the United States. On July 1, 1993, the Congressional Record recognized Pueblo as the "Home of Heroes." The other men were William J. Crawford, Raymond G. Murphy, and Carl L. Sitter.

Dix later received a direct commission to first lieutenant and retired as a major after 20 years of service. His last duty assignment was Executive Officer of the 4th Battalion, 9th Infantry Regiment, 172nd Infantry Brigade (Separate), Fort Wainwright, Alaska, from 1981 to 1982.

Later life
After leaving the army, Dix worked as a security consultant, ran an air service in Alaska, and served as Alaska's deputy commissioner for homeland security. 

In 2000, Dix wrote a memoir about the fight for Chau Phu entitled The Rescue of River City. Since receiving the medal, he has made numerous public speaking engagements. He currently lives in the interior region of Alaska.

In 2010, Dix co-founded the Center for American Values in Pueblo, Colorado.

Awards and decorations

Medal of Honor

The President of the United States in the name of the Congress takes pride in presenting the Medal of Honor to Staff Sergeant Drew Dennis Dix United States Army for service as set forth in the following citation:

Commendations

Publications
Dix, Drew. The Rescue of River City. Fairbanks, Alaska: Drew Dix Pub, 2000.

See also

List of Medal of Honor recipients for the Vietnam War

References

External links

 
 The Center for American Values
 

1944 births
Living people
People from Highlands, New York
United States Army officers
United States Army Medal of Honor recipients
Recipients of the Gallantry Cross (Vietnam)
United States Army personnel of the Vietnam War
Vietnam War recipients of the Medal of Honor
American memoirists
Historians of the Vietnam War